Rembercourt Aerodrome was a temporary World War I airfield in France.

Overview
An airfield was built and used by the French Air Service at "Rembercourt" in early 1916 and again in August 1918, before it was transferred to American Air Service in early September 1918.

From 1 September 1918, it became the home of the 1st Pursuit Group until the end of war, especially during both the St. Mihiel and Meuse-Argonne Offensives, with five squadrons: 27th, 94th, 95th, 147th and 185th Aero Squadrons. In addition, it was a repair depot for both aircraft and vehicles, being the home of the 4th Air Park and Flight "C", 648th Aero Squadron, along with various aircraft hangars, support buildings and quarters for personnel.

By the end of 1918, the Americans left and the airfield was abandoned and returned to agricultural use. Today, it is a series of cultivated fields located on the south side of the Départmental 902 (D902), northwest of Erize-la-Petite, with no indications of its wartime use. A large electrical windmill is now erected on the site.

Known units assigned
 Headquarters, 1st Pursuit Group, 1 September - 11 November 1918
 27th Aero Squadron (Pursuit) 3 September - 12 December 1918
 94th Aero Squadron (Pursuit) 1 September - 20 November 1918
 95th Aero Squadron (Pursuit) 2 September - 11 December 1918
 Flight Operated from: Verdun Aerodrome, 7 November 1918 - unknown 1919
 147th Aero Squadron (Pursuit) 1 September - 12 December 1918
 Flight operated from: Verdun Airdrome, 25 September 1918 - unknown 1919
 185th Aero Squadron, (Night Pursuit)) 7 October - 11 November 1918

See also

 List of Air Service American Expeditionary Force aerodromes in France

References

 Series "D", Volume 2, Squadron histories,. Gorrell's History of the American Expeditionary Forces Air Service, 1917–1919, National Archives, Washington, D.C.
 Series "N", Volume 16, History of the Air Service AND Special Aviation Maps AND Station Lists for Air Service Units, Oct-Dec 1918

External links

World War I sites of the United States
World War I airfields in France